The Challenge Belt was awarded to the winner of The Open Championship in golf from 1860 until 1870. It was replaced by the Claret Jug for the 1872 Open Championship which is still being used to the present day. The winner of the first Open Championship, Willie Park Sr., in 1860 at the Prestwick Golf Club received no prize money; instead, he was allowed to keep the Belt until the following Open Championship.

History

When the Prestwick Golf Club hosted the first Open Championship in 1860, the Earl of Eglinton suggested a special belt be commissioned for the event. The Belt is made from red Moroccan leather with a large silver buckle and featuring silver panels of golfing scenes with additional medallions denoting the winners and their scores. Members of the Prestwick Golf Club purchased it from Edinburgh silversmiths James & Walter Marshall for the sum of £25 (worth approximately £3,118 in 2021). There were specific rules to govern the management of the Belt:

In the 1870 Open Championship, Young Tom Morris won his third consecutive title (1868-1870) and the Challenge Belt became his own property. That left the Open Championship without a belt or trophy for the next year's winner. As a result, there was no Open Championship in 1871, and a new trophy had to be found. Prestwick Golf Club agreed to organize the tournament jointly with The Royal and Ancient Golf Club (the R&A) in St Andrews and the Honourable Company of Edinburgh Golfers. Together, they shared the cost of £30 for the new Claret Jug, called the Golf Champion Trophy.

Both the Challenge Belt and the Claret Jug are on display in the Royal & Ancient Clubhouse in St Andrews. The Royal and Ancient Golf Club took possession of the Challenge Belt after the death of Old Tom Morris in 1908 and the Claret Jug in 1928.

Winners of the Challenge Belt

Notes

References

Award items
The Open Championship